Fujiwara no Iratsume (藤原郎女; dates unknown) was a Japanese noblewoman and waka poet of the Nara period.

Biography 
Fujiwara no Iratsume's birth and death dates are unknown, as is her actual given name. (Iratsume means "young woman" or "daughter".)

The Man'yōshū Kogi (万葉集古義) speculates that she was the daughter of Fujiwara no Maro and perhaps Ōtomo no Sakanoue no Iratsume.

Poetry 
Poem 766 in the Man'yōshū is attributed to her.

References

Citations

Works cited 

 

8th-century Japanese poets
Man'yō poets
Japanese women poets
Fujiwara clan